A bootee (also bootie or booty) is a short soft sock or bootlike garment used for warmth or protection. Bootees for babies are usually thick and knitted, to keep the baby's feet warm. Dog booties for dogs such as sledge dogs in very cold Arctic conditions (see Iditarod Trail Sled Dog Race) protect the animal from the cold. Booties worn over the shoes in cold-weather biking similarly protect cyclists. 

Disposable socks, such as those worn for hygiene by surgical teams, are also called bootees.

References

External links

Hosiery
Infants' clothing